Gilia is a genus of between 25 and 50 species of flowering plants in the Polemoniaceae family and is related to phlox. These Western native plants are best sown in sunny, well-draining soil in the temperate and tropical regions of the Americas, where they occur mainly in desert or semi-desert habitats 

They are summer annuals, rarely perennials, growing to 10–120 cm tall. The leaves are spirally arranged, usually pinnate (rarely simple), forming a basal rosette in most species. The flowers are produced in a panicle, with a five-lobed corolla, which can be blue, white, pink or yellow.

Gilia species are used as food plants by the larvae of some Lepidoptera species including Schinia aurantiaca and Schinia biundulata (the latter feeds exclusively on G. cana).

Selected species

References

Flora of Chile: Gilia (pdf file)

 
Flora of North America
Polemoniaceae genera